Nationality words link to articles with information on the nation's poetry or literature (for instance, Irish or France).

Events
English poet Francis Quarles attends on the newly-married Elizabeth Stuart, Queen of Bohemia.

Works published

Great Britain
 Nicholas Breton, anonymously published, The Uncasing of Machivils Instructions to his Sonne
William Drummond of Hawthornden, Tears on the Death of Moeliades
 Henry Parrot, Laquei Ridiculosi; or, Springes for Woodcocks
 George Wither:
 Abuses Stript, and Whipt; or, Satirical Essayes
 Epithalamia; or, Nuptiall Poems, the work states "1612" but was published this year
 Richard Zouch, The Dove; or, Passages of Cosmography

On the death of Henry Frederick, Prince of Wales in 1612
See also 1612 in poetry

The November 6, 1612 death of Henry Frederick, Prince of Wales, at age 18, occasions these poems:
 Thomas Campion, Songs of Mourning: Bewailing the Untimely Death of Prince Henry, verse and music; music by Giovanni Coperario (or "Copario"), said to have been John Cooper, an Englishman
 George Chapman, An Epicede or Funerall Song, the work states "1612" but was published this year
 John Davies, The Muses-Teares for the Losse of their Hope
 William Drummond of Hawthornden, Tears on the Death of Moeliades
 Joshua Sylvester, Lachrimae Lachrimarum; or, The Distillation of Teares Shede for the Untimely Death of the Incomparable Prince Panaretus, originally published in 1612, the book went into its third edition this year, with Elegy upon [...] Prince Henry by John Donne added to this edition; (also includes poems in English, French, Latin and Italian by Walter Quin)

Spain 
 La Fábula de Polifemo y Galatea by Luis de Góngora y Argote

Births
Death years link to the corresponding "[year] in poetry" article:
 January 20 – Lucy Hastings (died 1679), Irish-born English poet and Countess of Huntingdon
 April 21 (bapt.) – Franciscus Plante (died 1690), Dutch poet and chaplain
 June 16 – John Cleveland (died 1658), English
 November 5 – Isaac de Benserade (died 1691), French
 Also:
 Richard Crashaw, born about this year (died 1649), English poet, styled "the divine," one of the Metaphysical poets
 Shah Inayatullah (died 1701), poet from Sindh, Pakistan
 Khushal Khattak (died 1689), Pashtun warrior, poet and tribal chief
 Ye Xiaowan born about this year, Chinese poet and daughter of poet Shen Yixiu; also sister of women poets Ye Wanwan and Ye Xiaoluan

Deaths
Birth years link to the corresponding "[year] in poetry" article:
 January 2 – Salima Sultan Begum (Makhfi) (born 1539), Mughal empress consort and Urdu poet
 March – Lupercio Leonardo de Argensola, (born 1559), Spanish playwright and poet
 April 6–9 – Natshinnaung (born (1578), Toungoo prince, poet and musician (executed)
 August 22 – Dominicus Baudius (born 1561), Dutch Neo-Latin poet, scholar and historian
 September 15 – Sir Thomas Overbury (born 1581), English poet and essayist (probably poisoned by Frances Howard, Countess of Somerset)
 October 9 – Henry Constable (born 1562), English Catholic polemicist and poet
 October 22 – Mathurin Régnier (born 1573), French satirical poet; nephew of Philippe Desportes
 November 16 – Trajano Boccalini (born 1556), Italian satirical poet
Also:
 Govindadasa (born 1535), Bengali Vaishnava poet known for his body of devotional songs addressed to Krishna
 Phùng Khắc Khoan (born 1528), Vietnamese military strategist, politician, diplomat and poet
 Dinko Zlatarić (born 1558), Croatian poet and translator

See also

 Poetry
 17th century in poetry
 17th century in literature

Notes

17th-century poetry
Poetry